Lella is a given name and a surname.

Given name
 Lella Cuberli (born 1945), American soprano
 Lella A. Dillard (1863–1935), American temperance leader
 Lella Fabrizi (1915–1993), Italian stage, television and film actress
 Lella Secor Florence (1887–1966), American writer, journalist, pacifist, feminist and pioneer of birth control
 Lella Kmar (1862–1942), queen consort of Tunisia
 Lella Lombardi (1941–1992), Italian racing driver
 Lella Ricci (1850–1871), Italian opera singer
 Lella Vignelli (1934–2016), Italian architect, designer, and entrepreneur
 Lella Warren (1899–1982), American novelist and short story writer

Surname
 Gustavo Di Lella (born 1973), Argentinian footballer
 Luigi Di Lella (born 1937), Italian experimental particle physicist
 Penèlope di Lella (born 1974), Dutch short track speed skater
 Jan Lella (born 1989), Belgian football midfielder
 Nunzio Lella (born 2000), Italian footballer